Michael Archer (1943 – 28 October 2018) was an Irish Gaelic footballer who played as a right corner-forward at senior level for the Cork county team.

Born in Ballyphehane, Cork, Archer first played competitive football in his youth. He arrived on the inter-county scene at the age of seventeen when he first linked up with the Cork minor team, before later joining the under-21 side. He joined the senior panel during the 1965 championship and enjoyed a brief one-year inter-county career.

At club level Archer was a three-time Munster medallist with the St Finbarr's senior hurlers. In addition to this he also won three championship medals.

Honours
St Finbarr's
Munster Senior Club Hurling Championship (3): 1965, 1968, 1974
Cork Senior Hurling Championship (3): 1965, 1968, 1974
Cork
All-Ireland Minor Football Championship (1): 1961
Munster Minor Football Championship (1): 1961

References

1943 births
2018 deaths
St Finbarr's Gaelic footballers
St Finbarr's hurlers
Cork inter-county Gaelic footballers